Cardiaspis is a genus of beetles in the family Buprestidae, containing the following species:

 Cardiaspis babaulti Thery, 1928
 Cardiaspis mouhotii Saunders, 1866
 Cardiaspis pisciformis Thery, 1904

References

Buprestidae genera